The Apertura and Clausura system was a single round-robin tournament format used for the Argentine Primera División championships. Introduced in 1990–91, it lasted until the 2012–13 season when it was replaced by the "Inicial and Final", a similar tournament.

History
The top-flight of Argentine football had 20 teams, with seasons divided into two tournaments: "Apertura" ("opening") championship which opened the season and was contested in the second half of the calendar year, and "Clausura" ("closing") championship that closed the season and was played in the first half of the following year. Each Apertura or Clausura consisted of a single round robin of 19 rounds, and there were 10 matches per round.

1990–91 controversy
The first season saw the two champions play a championship decider to determine the overall champions. Newell's Old Boys beat Boca Juniors on penalties controversially denying Boca their first official league championship since 1981, when Boca had been clearly the best team of the season. Since the following season, both the champions of the Apertura and the Clausura have been recognized as official champions.

1991–92 onwards
Between the 1991–92 season and the 1994–95 seasons, the league used the old two points for a win system. From the 1995–96 season the Argentine Association adopted the 3 points for a win system.

Number of Championships by team
Excluding 1990-91 which was won outright by Newell's Old Boys.

See also
Argentine Primera División
Metropolitano championship
Nacional championship
Football in Argentina

References

Argentina 1990s by Osvaldo José Gorgazzi and Victor Hugo Kurhy  at rsssf
Argentina 2000s by Osvaldo José Gorgazzi at rsssf

Argentine Primera División